Royal Consort Sun of the Gyoha No clan (Hangul: 순비 노씨, Hanja: 順妃 盧氏; d. 1394) was a Korean queen consort as the primary and only wife of King Gongyang of Goryeo. She was the fifth (last) Goryeo queen consort who didn't receive a posthumous name like the other queen consorts following Lady Yi.

In 1389, following her husband ascended the throne as King Gongyang by the Yi Seong-gye's powerful clan, she also officially become the Queen consort in 1389. The new king then established the "Department of Justice" (의덕부) and placed a bureaucracy for his wife's family, the No clan (노씨). They later had a son and three daughters. Around 1392, along with her husband, they were dethroned and exiled to Wonju, Goseong, and Samcheok.

In 1394, after receiving an apology from Yi, they were judged together by the new court. There was a theory said that the two committed suicide by jumping into the water. They then buried in the same tomb at Wondang, Gyeonggi-do and Samcheok, Gangwon-do.

Family 
 Grandfather 
 No Chaek (노책, 盧頙) (? - 1335)
 Grandmother 
 Princess Gyeongnyeong (경녕옹주, 慶寧翁主) (? - 1335)
 Father
 No Jin (노진, 盧稹) (? - 1376)
 Mother
 Royal Consort Myeongui of the Hong clan (명의비 홍씨, 明懿妃 洪氏)
 Husband 
 King Gongyang of Goryeo (고려 공양왕) (9 March 1345 - 17 May 1394)
 Father-in-law - Wang Gyun, Prince Jeongwon (정원부원군 왕균)
 Mother-in-law - Grand Royal Consort Guk of the Kaeseong Wang clan (국대비 왕씨)
 Issue
 Daughter - Princess Suknyeong (숙녕궁주)
 Son-in-law - Wang Jip, Prince Ikcheon (익천군 왕집, 王緝) (? - 1392)
 Daughter - Princess Jeongsin (정신궁주) (? - 1421)
 Son-in-law - Woo Seong-beom (우성범, 禹成範) (? - 31 July 1392)
 Granddaughter - Woo Gye-in (우계인)
 Grandson-in-law - Jeong Yeon (정연, 鄭淵)
 Daughter - Princess Gyeonghwa (경화궁주)
 Son-in-law - Kang Hoe-gye (강회계, 姜淮季) (? - 1392)
 Son - Wang Seok, Prince Jeongseong (왕석 정성군) (? - 1394)
 Daughter-in-law - Lady Yi of the Incheon Yi clan (인천 이씨, 仁川 李氏)

In popular culture
Portrayed by Park Hye-sook in the 1983 KBS TV series Foundation of the Kingdom.
Portrayed by Kim Young-ae in the 1983 MBC TV series The King of Chudong Palace.
Portrayed by Kang Gyeong-hun in the 1996–1998 KBS TV series Tears of the Dragon.

References

External links
 

14th-century births
14th-century deaths
Royal consorts of the Goryeo Dynasty
14th-century Korean women